Major-General John Byne Skerrett (177710 March 1814) was a British army officer who fought in the Peninsular War.

Biography
Born in Cheshire, John Byrne Skerrett was the only son of Lieutenant General John Nicholas Skerrett. He was appointed ensign in the 99th Regiment of Foot in 1783, lieutenant 79th Foot in 1784, lieutenant 19th Foot in 1791, captain 123rd Foot in 1795, captain 69th Foot 1795, major 83rd Foot in 1798, lieutenant-colonel 83rd Foot in 1800, half-pay 1803, lieutenant-colonel 10th Battalion Reserve in 1803, lieutenant-colonel 47th Foot in 1804, brevet colonel in 1810 and major-general in 1813.

In the Peninsular War he was with his regiment in Cadiz in 1809 when appointed to the command of the 2nd British Brigade (2/47th (Lancashire) and 20th Portuguese Infantry, two battalions) in May. Then Skerrett and his own regiment, the 2/47th, was detached as part of the doomed attempt to aid the beleaguered Spanish garrison at Tarragona. Skerrett and his detachment rejoined the force at Cadiz in July.

Skerrett was commander of the British defending force at the Siege of Tarifa in 1811 and 1812, and participated in the Battle of the Triana Bridge in 1812.

He was a brigade commander under Sir Thomas Graham in the Netherlands from 1813 to 1814 and died in the assault on Bergen op Zoom in 1814.

There is a memorial to Skerrett in the north transept of St Paul's Cathedral, London, and another, raised by his mother, was in St George's Porch of St Nicholas' Church, Newcastle upon Tyne (now Newcastle Cathedral) in the early 19th century.

References

British Army personnel of the Peninsular War
1778 births
1814 deaths
British military personnel killed in action in the Napoleonic Wars